Dziennik Polska-Europa-Świat was a Polish nationwide daily newspaper published by Ringier Axel Springer, a joint venture between Germany's Axel Springer Verlag publishing company and Swiss media company Ringier.

History
It was modelled on Springer's Welt Kompakt, the Berliner-style edition of the Hamburg-published broadsheet Die Welt. The first issue was released on 18 April 2006, and in May 2006 it recorded a circulation of 211,610 copies, giving it the third largest circulation amongst national newspapers. Dziennik was envisaged as a competitor to Gazeta Wyborcza, therefore its political profile was more right-wing than its left-liberal rival. In most cases, however, it presented a broad spectrum of views on its pages.

On 14 September 2009 "Dziennik" was merged with Infor Bizness's "Gazeta Prawna" daily to form a new nationwide daily under the title "Dziennik Gazeta Prawna".

Columnists
Jerzy Pilch
Maciej Rybiński
Jan Rokita
Albin Siwak

References

See also
Dziennik Online

2006 establishments in Poland
2009 disestablishments in Poland
Defunct newspapers published in Poland
Publications established in 2006
Publications disestablished in 2009
Polish-language newspapers
Newspapers published in Warsaw
Axel Springer SE
Daily newspapers published in Poland